Bang Bang Baby is a 2022 Italian crime drama television series created by Andrea Di Stefano and directed by Michele Alhaique, Giuseppe Bonito and Margherita Ferri. It was internationally released on Prime Video on 28 April 2022.

Cast
Arianna Becheroni as Alice Barone
Adriano Giannini as Santo Maria Barone
Antonio Gerardi as Nereo Ferraù
Dora Romano as Guendalina "Lina" Barone
Giuseppe De Domenico as Rocco Cosentino
Giorgia Arena as Assunta Ferraù
Lucia Mascino as Gabriella Giammatteo

References

External links
 

Teen drama television series
2020s crime television series
Italian-language television shows
Italian crime television series
Television series about organized crime
Television series about teenagers